Aurélia Corine Nobels (born January 7, 2007 in Boston) is a Brazilian-Belgian female racing driver. She is set to compete in 2023 Italian F4 Championship with Prema Racing. She is a member of the Ferrari Driver Academy.

Career

Lower formulae 
Nobels made her car racing debut in F4 Brazilian Championship in 2022 with TMG Racing. She finished the season 16th with 7 points. She also made a one-off appearance in F4 Spanish Championship. She competed in one round of the F4 Danish Championship where she scored 10 points.

In 2023 she is due to compete in the Italian F4 Championship. She was supposed to start for Iron Lynx but later changed the team to Prema Racing.

Formula One 
In December 2022 she won in Senior category in "Girls on Track – Rising Stars" – programme organized by the FIA Women in Motorsport Commission and was awarded a place in Ferrari Driver Academy.

Personal life 
She was born in Boston to Belgian parents and she grew up in Brazil.

She has competed under the flags of both Brazil and Belgium.

Racing record

References

External links 

2007 births
Living people
Brazilian racing drivers
Brazilian female racing drivers
Belgian racing drivers
Belgian female racing drivers
Spanish F4 Championship drivers
Italian F4 Championship drivers
Danish F4 Championship drivers
Prema Powerteam drivers
Racing drivers from Boston
Racing drivers from Massachusetts